The Irish Appeals Act 1783 (23 Geo. 3. c. 28), commonly known as the Renunciation Act, was an Act of the Parliament of Great Britain. By it the British Parliament renounced all right to legislate for Ireland, and declared that no appeal from the decision of any court in Ireland could be heard in any court in Great Britain.

Background
The Declaratory Act 1719 declared that the king and parliament of Great Britain had "full power and authority to make laws and statutes of sufficient validity to bind the Kingdom and people of Ireland", and that the Irish House of Lords had no power to hear appeals from Irish courts. This was greatly resented by the Irish parliament. In the early 1780s, the combination of political pressure from individuals such as Henry Grattan and Henry Flood and the conventions of the Irish Volunteers, at a time when Britain was involved in the American Revolutionary War, led to the passing of the Repeal Act of 1782, which granted legislative independence to the Kingdom of Ireland. A small number of Irish politicians believed that repeal of the act did not imply that the British parliament could not assume the right to legislate for Ireland. As W. E. H. Lecky put it, "the Declaratory Act had not made the right, and therefore its repeal could not destroy it." Flood became convinced that it was necessary that the British parliament pass an act specifically renouncing any right to legislate for Ireland. Initially the majority of the Irish parliament, including Grattan, opposed such a move. Later that year, however, Lord Mansfield heard an appeal from an Irish court in the English King's Bench. This had the effect of strengthening Flood's hand, and the result was the passage, on 17 April 1783, of the Renunciation Act.

Content
The Act contained two sections. The first declared

The second dealt specifically with the right of appeal:

The statute did not state that appeals from Irish courts lay with the Irish House of Lords, but in practice the Irish House of Lords took on this function.

End of operation
The Act of Union 1800 abolished the Irish parliament, and thus ended legislative independence. That act did not repeal the Renunciation Act, and even the Statute Law Revision Act 1871 repealed only a few short sentences at the end of section 2 relating to records of proceedings before 1782. Indeed, the act was still on the statute books when the Short Titles Act was passed in 1896.

References

Great Britain Acts of Parliament 1783